The Ordeal is a lost 1922 American silent drama film directed by Paul Powell and written by Beulah Marie Dix and W. Somerset Maugham. The film stars Clarence Burton, Agnes Ayres, Conrad Nagel, Edna Murphy, Anne Schaefer, Gino Corrado, and Adele Farrington. The film was released on May 21, 1922, by Paramount Pictures.

Plot
As described in a film magazine, Sybil Bruce (Ayres) agreed to a marriage with her older drunken and abusive husband George Bruce (Burton) to provide for her invalid sister and young brother. The husband's physician Dr. Robert Acton (Nagel) is regarded as a rival and is not permitted in the house. A will is drafted that stipulates that the wife will forfeit her claim to the husband's wealth if she remarries after his death. When the husband dies, Sybil believes that in failing to provide him his medicine, she had murdered him. The money she inherits allows her to pay for an operation that restores her sister's health. But her sister becomes headstrong and wasteful, and her younger brother follows the same path. Dr. Robert Acton returns, but the sister and brother prevent the natural marriage. There is a big scene at a roadhouse where an aged, former family nurse saves Sybil and tells her that she poisoned the deceased husband. There follows a happy ending with Sybil and the doctor.

Cast
Agnes Ayres as Sybil Bruce
Clarence Burton as George Bruce
Conrad Nagel as Dr. Robert Acton
Edna Murphy as Helen Brayshaw
Anne Schaefer as Minnie
Gino Corrado as Gene
Adele Farrington as Madame St. Levis
Edward Martindel as Sir Francis Maynard
Shannon Day as Kitty
Claire Du Brey as Elise
A. Edward Sutherland as Victim

References

External links 

1922 films
1920s English-language films
Silent American drama films
1922 drama films
Paramount Pictures films
Films directed by Paul Powell (director)
American black-and-white films
Lost American films
American silent feature films
1922 lost films
Lost drama films
1920s American films